Jim Miller may refer to:

Sports
 Jim Miller (fighter) (born 1983), American mixed martial artist
 Jim Miller (infielder) (1880–1937), Major League Baseball infielder
 Jim Miller (pitcher) (born 1982), Major League Baseball pitcher
 Jim Miller (halfback) (1908–1965), American football player
 Jim Miller (American football coach) (1920-2006), American college football coach
 Jim Miller (end) (1932–2006), Canadian football player
 Jim Miller (offensive guard) (born 1949), American football player
 Jim Miller (punter) (born 1957), former NFL player
 Jim Miller (quarterback) (born 1971), former NFL player
 Jim Miller (skier) (born 1947), American Olympic skier
 Jim Miller (Australian footballer, born 1919), Australian rules footballer for Footscray
 Jim "Frosty" Miller (born 1944), Australian rules footballer for Carlton and Dandenong
 Jim Miller (curler), Scottish curler
 Jim Miller (athletic director), University of Richmond athletic director

Other
 Jim Miller (film editor) (born 1955), American film editor
 Jim Miller (linguist), professor of cognitive linguistics at the University of Auckland
Jim Miller (physicist), professor of physics at Washington University in St. Louis
 Jim Miller (outlaw) (1866–1909), outlaw in the American West
 Jim Miller (musician) (born 1954), American jam band guitarist and singer
 Jim Wayne Miller (1936–1996), American poet and educator
Jim Miller (animator), storyboard artist and supervisor for My Little Pony: Friendship Is Magic, as well as director for Johnny Test

See also
 Jimmy Miller (disambiguation)
 James Miller (disambiguation)